Saskia Budgett (born 21 September 1996) is a British rower. In 2021, she won a European bronze medal (with Holly Nixon) in the double sculls in Varese, Italy. She has been selected as a reserve for the 2020 Summer Olympics. She is openly lesbian and is in a relationship with Kyra Edwards, also a British rower.  Budgett and Edwards competed together at the 2022 European Championships and 2022 World Rowing Championship.

References

External links
 UCLA Bruins

Living people
1996 births
British female rowers
UCLA Bruins women's rowers
British LGBT sportspeople